Lee Dae-soo (born August 21, 1981) is a South Korean professional baseball infielder for the SK Wyverns of the KBO League.

References

External links
Career statistics and player information from Korea Baseball Organization

Lee Dae-soo at SK Wyverns Baseball Club 

SSG Landers players
KBO League infielders
South Korean baseball players
Hanwha Eagles players
Doosan Bears players
People from Gunsan
1981 births
Living people
Sportspeople from North Jeolla Province